Spencer Burford (born July 19, 2000) is an American football guard for the San Francisco 49ers of the National Football League (NFL). He played college football at UTSA.

Professional career

Burford was drafted by the San Francisco 49ers in the fourth round, 134th overall, of the 2022 NFL Draft.

References

External links
 San Francisco 49ers bio
 UTSA Roadrunners bio

2000 births
Living people
Players of American football from San Antonio
American football offensive linemen
UTSA Roadrunners football players
San Francisco 49ers players